Andrzej Gawroński (10 February 1935 – 4 September 2020) was a Polish film and theatre actor. He was the brother of actor .

References

External links

1935 births
2020 deaths
Male actors from Warsaw
Polish male film actors
Polish male stage actors
Polish male voice actors